Hocking State Forest is a state forest in Hocking County, Ohio, United States. The forest adjoins Hocking Hills State Park and three nature preserves including Conkle's Hollow State Nature Preserve.

The forest is in one of the most scenic areas of Ohio, known as the Hocking Hills. The area features not only forests, but frequent bluffs, rock shelters and waterfalls, due to the Blackhand sandstone.

See also 
Hocking Hills
Hocking Hills State Park

References

Ohio state forests
Protected areas of Hocking County, Ohio
State parks of the Appalachians